Mangalore is a closed station located in the township of Mangalore, at the junction of the North East and Goulburn Valley railway lines in Victoria, Australia. The station was one of 35 closed to passenger traffic on 4 October 1981 as part of the New Deal timetable for country passengers. The former station building was moved from the site, and currently sits in a yard on the way into nearby Avenel.

The station was located on a triangular wedge between the two lines, and was once the end of the double track from Melbourne. The signal box at the station was closed in 1989 when the junction of the North East and Goulburn Valley lines was moved to Seymour, and the two lines worked independently.

References

External links
 Photo: The signal box and station building in 1985

Disused railway stations in Victoria (Australia)